Thermophyte (Greek thérmos = warmth, heat + phyton = plant)  is an organism which is tolerant or thriving  at high temperatures. These organisms are categorized according to ecological valences at high temperatures, including biological extremely. Such organisms included the hot-spring taxa also.

A large amount of thermophytes are algae, more specifically blue-green algae, also referred to as cyanobacteria. This type of algae thrives in hot conditions ranging anywhere from 50 to 70 degrees Celsius, which other plants and organisms cannot survive in. Thermophytes are able to survive extreme temperatures as their cells contain an “unorganized nucleus”.

As the name suggests, thermophytes are found in high temperatures. They can be found in abundance in and around places like freshwater hot springs, such as YellowStone National park and in the Lassen Volcanic National park.

Mutualism in Thermophytes 

There are instances in which a fungus and plant become thermophytes by forming a symbiotic relationship with one another. Some thermophytes live with a fungal partner in a symbiotic relationship with plants, algae, and viruses. Mutualists like the panic grass and its fungal partner cannot survive individually, but thrive when they are in the symbiotic relationship. This means the fungus, plant, and virus function together to survive in such extreme conditions by benefiting from each other. The fungi typically dwells in the intracellular spaces between the plant's cells.

In a study performed at Washington State, it was discovered that panic grass living near the hot springs in Yellowstone National park thrive due to their relationship with the fungus Curvularia protuberata. Neither organism can survive on their own at such high temperatures. The mycoviruses infect the fungi that live within these plants and algae. These mycoviruses prevent the fungi from having a pathogenic effect on the plants, thus preventing the fungus from harming the plant. The panic grass benefits because the fungi potentially help to disperse the heat and alert the plant of any environmental stress that the plant should activate its response.

The study at Washington State has led to the discovery of a way to use these relationships between fungi and plants to make crops more thermo-tolerant, allowing them to resist damage by heat.

The most famous of these ecological groups of organisms are:
Deinococcota, including Thermus aquaticus, a species of bacteria.
Cyanobacteria,  blue-green algae.
Oscillatoria terebriformis
Oscillatoria brevis 
Heterohormogonium (motile cell filaments formed by cyanobacteria)
Synechococcus elongatus
Scytonema
Panic grass (panic grass with a fungal association with Curvularia)

See also
Thermophylae
Cyanobacteria
Thermophylae
Cyanobacteria
Mycovirus 
Algae
Curvularia protuberata

References

Ecology
Habitat
Cyanobacteria
Biology
Plants